The 1981 Division I NCAA Men's Lacrosse Championship game was played at Princeton University in front of 13,943 fans. North Carolina capped off a 12 and 0 season with its first-ever NCAA championship, as they defeated previously unbeaten Johns Hopkins, 14 to 13.

Tournament overview
North Carolina scored five goals in the fourth quarter to defeat Johns Hopkins in a come-from-behind victory, coming back from a three-goal deficit. This win by the Tar Heels snapped a three-year winning streak by Johns Hopkins in NCAA finals. Hopkins had finished first or second in eight of the 11 NCAA championships and had been on a 22-game unbeaten streak. This title was North Carolina's first in lacrosse.

The Tar Heels were led by coach Willie Scroggs, former Johns Hopkins' top assistant coach. North Carolina had been ranked number two in the USILA poll behind three-time defending national champion Johns Hopkins entering the tournament. Scroggs who played midfield at Hopkins, turned the Tar Heels into national champions after only three seasons as coach.

Annapolis native Michael Burnett was selected USILA first team All-America. The University of North Carolina's leading scorer, Burnett a sophomore, was among the first of a group of high-profile Maryland players recruited by Willie Scroggs to North Carolina as the school quickly built its program into a national power. Over the next decade, North Carolina would be among the top lacrosse programs, with four national titles and nine Final Four appearances.

For Hopkins, the prior four-year period included 53 wins against three losses, to go with three national championships. During this stretch, the Blue Jays won a record 11 straight NCAA tournament games, a record later tied by Syracuse.

National Player of the Year Jeff Cook scored six goals for Hopkins. Cook got Hopkins to within one goal with 45 seconds left in the game on a tremendous individual effort, stick-handling past four UNC defenders and rocketing a shot past the goaltender. Hopkins, though, lost the ensuing  final face-off.

Tournament results

Tournament boxscores

Tournament Finals - May 30, 1981

Tournament Semi-Finals - May 23, 1981

Tournament First Round

Tournament outstanding players

 Jeff Cook, Attack, Johns Hopkins, tournament Most Outstanding Player

See also
1981 NCAA Division II Lacrosse Championship
1981 NCAA Division III Lacrosse Championship

References

External links
 1981 Title Game on YouTube

NCAA Division I Men's Lacrosse Championship
NCAA Division I Men's Lacrosse Championship
NCAA Division I Men's Lacrosse Championship
NCAA Division I Men's Lacrosse Championship
NCAA Division I Men's Lacrosse Championship